Coronado (São Romão e São Mamede) is a civil parish in the municipality of Trofa, Portugal. It was formed in 2013 by the merger of the former parishes São Romão and São Mamede. The population in 2011 was 9,119, in an area of 10.98 km2. The town Coronado is an industrial center.

References

Freguesias of Trofa
2013 establishments in Portugal